Hibernaculum is a studio album by the American musical group Earth, though acknowledged as an EP by the band. All of the songs, except for "A Plague of Angels", are older Earth songs that were re-recorded in the country-influenced style of Hex. The album includes a DVD with a documentary by Seldon Hunt, called "Within the Drone". Both "Coda Maestoso in F (Flat) Minor" and a "A Plague of Angels" appear in the documentary, "The Wild and Wonderful Whites of West Virginia".

Track listing

Credits
Dylan Carlson – guitar
Adrienne Davies – drums, percussion
Don McGreevy – bass guitar, upright bass
Greg Anderson – Korg ms-20 bass
Steve Moore – trombone, Hammond B-3, Mellotron, Wurlitzer electric piano
Randall Dunn – low drone
Stephen O'Malley and Seldon Hunt – art direction
Seldon Hunt — photography and text
Jason Evans – Carlson portraiture
Mell Dettmer – mastering at Sinister Kitchen

2007 albums
Earth (American band) albums
Southern Lord Records albums